Axymyia is a genus of nematoceran flies in the family Axymyiidae. It contains only one described species, Axymyia furcata, from eastern North America. A second species, Axymyia japonica , is sometimes listed, but this species is now generally placed in the related genus Protaxymyia.

References

Further reading

 

Axymyiomorpha
Nematocera genera
Articles created by Qbugbot
Monotypic Diptera genera
Taxa named by Waldo Lee McAtee
Diptera of North America